Sinjangnim Station is a station of the Busan Metro Line 1 in Jangrim-dong, Saha District, Busan, South Korea.

Station Layout

External links
  Cyber station information from Busan Transportation Corporation

Busan Metro stations